"Headed for a Heartbreak" is a single by American glam metal band Winger, from their self-titled debut album Winger. Released in May 1989, the power ballad reached #19 on the US Hot 100 and #8 on the US Mainstream Rock chart. The B-side to the single was "State of Emergency".

The music video for "Headed for a Heartbreak" was directed by Mark Rezyka and edited by Scott C. Wilson.

Background

Singer Kip Winger was fooling around with his keyboard at the end of a day in the studio, and came up with the riff, which is in D Lydian mode. He jammed on the riff a little bit, and "it was just one of those things that happened magically. ... A lot of times I'll sit down and the shit will just drop into my hands and I don't even think about it. That was one of those songs." He added, "Once I figured out what I had, I rotated the bass notes around the common tones of the right hand on the keyboard stuff, so there was some music theory at play in that song, at the end of it. But basically the riff just fell onto me by accident."

Winger said that for him, the song "exemplifies the band the most because of the way Rod drums and Reb's solo. It's in Lydian and it's more out in the zone of where we all come from."

Charts

References

Winger (band) songs
1989 singles
Glam metal ballads
Song recordings produced by Beau Hill
Songs written by Kip Winger
1988 songs
Atlantic Records singles
1980s ballads